Dead Reflection is the ninth studio album by Canadian post-hardcore band Silverstein, released on July 14, 2017 through Rise Records worldwide and New Damage Records in Canada. This was the band's last album on Rise Records.

Background and recording 
In December 2016, Shane Told spoke to Alternative Press about their single "Ghost" and the then-upcoming album Dead Reflection.

In an interview with Alternative Press on June 15, 2017, Told detailed what drove the writing of Dead Reflection:

On June 28, 2017, Silverstein released a studio documentary to give fans more information about the album and the making of it.

Release 
On October 13, 2016, Silverstein debuted the stand-alone single "Ghost" on Sirius XM Faction, and released a music video for the song. "Ghost" is featured on Dead Reflection.

On May 18, 2017, Silverstein announced the title of the album, and debuted the first single, "Retrograde", with its own music video.

On June 15, 2017, Silverstein premiered "Lost Positives" through Alternative Press website, where Told and Paul Marc Rousseau discussed the song and album in a short interview.

On July 6, 2017, Silverstein released the track "Whiplash" through Rise Records' YouTube channel. "Mirror Box" was released on July 10.

Track listing

Charts

References 

2017 albums
Rise Records albums
Silverstein (band) albums